The 1984 Maybelline Classic was a tennis tournament played on outdoor hard courts in Fort Lauderdale, Florida in the United States that was part of the 1984 Virginia Slims World Championship Series. The tournament was held from September 17 through September 23, 1984. First-seeded Martina Navratilova won the singles title.

Finals

Singles
 Martina Navratilova defeated  Michelle Torres 6–1, 6–0
 It was Navratilova's 11th singles title of the year and the 97th of her career.

Doubles
 Martina Navratilova /  Elizabeth Smylie defeated  Barbara Potter /  Sharon Walsh 2–6, 6–2, 6–3
 It was Navratilova's 19th title of the year and the 198th of her career. It was Smylie's 2nd title of the year and the 7th of her career.

References

External links
 ITF tournament edition details

Maybelline Classic
Maybelline Classic
Maybelline Classic
Maybelline Classic
Maybelline Classic